Robert Strauss may refer to:

 Robert Strauss (actor) (1913–1975), American actor
 Robert S. Strauss (1918–2014), American attorney, politician and diplomat
 Robert P. Strauss, American economist
 Robert Strauß (born 1986), German footballer with FC Augsburg
 Robert Strauss (wrestler) (born 1983), American wrestler signed to WWE, better known as Robbie E